A designated place is a type of geographic unit used by Statistics Canada to disseminate census data. It is usually "a small community that does not meet the criteria used to define incorporated municipalities or Statistics Canada population centres (areas with a population of at least 1,000 and no fewer than 400 persons per square kilometre)." Provincial and territorial authorities collaborate with Statistics Canada in the creation of designated places so that data can be published for sub-areas within municipalities. Starting in 2016, Statistics Canada allowed the overlapping of designated places with population centres.

In the 2021 Census of Population, Saskatchewan had 198 designated places, an increase from 193 in 2016. Designated place types in Saskatchewan include 2 cluster subdivisions, 40 dissolved municipalities, 9 northern settlements, 143 organized hamlets, 2 resort subdivisions, and 2 retired population centre. Saskatchewan's largest designated place is Gravelbourg with a population of 986.

List

See also 
List of census agglomerations in Saskatchewan
List of cities in Saskatchewan
List of communities in Saskatchewan
List of ghost towns in Saskatchewan
List of hamlets in Saskatchewan
List of Indian reserves in Saskatchewan
List of municipalities in Saskatchewan
List of population centres in Saskatchewan
List of resort villages in Saskatchewan
List of rural municipalities in Saskatchewan
List of towns in Saskatchewan
List of villages in Saskatchewan

Notes

References 

Designated